Marsh Hall is a building and U.S. National Historic Landmark at Yale University in New Haven, Connecticut, also known as the Othniel C. Marsh House.

Marsh Hall may also refer to:

Marsh Hall (Pacific University), in Forest Grove, Oregon, a Pacific University building built in 1895
Marsh Hall (Salem State University), a residence hall in Massachusetts
Marsh Hall (Concord University), built in 1912, originally called "Old Main"
Marsh Hall (Combs, Derbyshire), a Grade II listed building from the 17th century
Marsh Hall (Northowram), a Grade II listed building from the 17th century
Marsh Hall (Kirkburton) a Grade II listed building from 1596

See also
Marshall Hall (disambiguation)
Marsh House (disambiguation)

Architectural disambiguation pages